The 1940 international cricket season was abandoned and There were no any international tournaments held during this season due to initial impact of the Second World War.

See also
 Cricket in World War II

References

International cricket competitions by season
1940 in cricket